Boggs may refer to:

Places
 Boggs Township, Armstrong County, Pennsylvania
 Boggs Township, Centre County, Pennsylvania
 Boggs Township, Clearfield County, Pennsylvania
 Boggs, West Virginia
 Boggs Island, on the Ohio River, West Virginia
 Boggs (PAT station)

Other
 Boggs (surname)
 The Boggs, indie rock band from New York City
 USS Boggs (DD-136) (1918–1946), Wickes class destroyer in the United States Navy
 Boggs, character in The Hunger Games novels

See also
 Bogs (disambiguation)
 Bloggs